The Lorraine 9N Algol was a French 9-cylinder radial aeroengine built and used in the 1930s.

Design and development
The Algol was a conventionally laid out radial engine, with nine cylinders in a single row.  The crankcase was a barrel-shaped aluminium alloy casting, with an internal integral diaphragm which held the front crankshaft bearing.  Forward of the diaphragm there was an integrally cast cam-gear case for the double track cam-ring.  The reduction gear was housed under a domed casing attached to the front of the crankcase.

Flange-mounted steel barrels were bolted to the crankcase and enclosed with cast aluminium alloy, screwed-on, cylinder head with integral cooling fins. The pistons were also made of aluminium alloy and had floating gudgeon pins. The nine pistons drove the single throw crankshaft via one channel-section master rod and eight circular section auxiliary rods.  The master rod had an integral, split type big-end. The crankshaft was machined  from a single forging, with bolt-on balance weights.

The Algol had a single pair of overhead inlet and exhaust valves per cylinder. The cam-ring drove roller tappets, mounted in the cam-case, which in turn operated rocker arms, fitted with ball bearings, via pushrods.  The cam-ring was concentric with the crankshaft and driven via epicyclic gears.

Most Algols were conventionally aspirated via a single carburetter
but at least one 1938 variant used a form of fuel injection, where fuel was blown into the induction system rather than the cylinder head.

Variants
9A
9Ab
9Ac
9Ad
9N Algol 
9Na Algol
9N Algol-Junior
9N Algol-Major
9N Algol-Amelioré
Type 120 500 hp A developed version with supercharger and reduction gear giving  at

Applications
ANF Les Mureaux 120
Bernard 161
Bloch 120
Bloch MB.500
Caudron C.180
FBA 290
Loire 11
Potez 33
Potez 40
PWS-24
Romano R.16
SAB-SEMA 12
Lorraine-Hanriot LH.70
Weymann 66

Specifications

References

1930s aircraft piston engines
Aircraft air-cooled radial piston engines
Algol